Jason Peter Miller (born November 23, 1983) is an American mathematician, specializing in probability theory.

After graduating from Okemos High School, Miller matriculated in 2002 at the University of Michigan, where he graduated in 2006 with a B.S. with joint majors in mathematics, computer science, and economics. In 2006 he became a graduate student in mathematics at Stanford University. In 2011 he graduated there with a PhD supervised by Amir Dembo with dissertation Limit theorems for Ginzburg-Landau  random surfaces . Miller was a summer intern in 2009 at Microsoft Research and in 2010 at D.E. Shaw & Co. He was a postdoctoral researcher from September 2010 to July 2012 at Microsoft and from July 2012 to July 2015 (as a Schramm Fellow and a NSF Fellow) at MIT's department of mathematics, where he worked with Scott Sheffield. In 2015 Miller became a reader at Trinity College, Cambridge and in the University of Cambridge's Statistics Laboratory.

His research deals with many aspects of probability theory, including "stochastic interface models (random surfaces and SLE), random walk, mixing times for Markov chains, and interacting particle systems."

With Scott Sheffield, he did research on the geometry of d-dimensional Gaussian free fields (GFF fields), also called (Euclidean bosonic) massless free fields, which are d-dimensional analogs of Brownian motion. The two mathematicians introduced an "imaginary geometry" which made it possible to integrate the Schramm-Loewner evolution in many GFF fields. Miller and Sheffield also proved that two models of measure-endowed random surfaces, namely Liouville quantum gravity and the Brownian map, are equivalent. (The two models were introduced by Alexander Markovich Polyakov.)

Miller won the Rollo Davidson Prize in 2015, the Whitehead Prize in 2016, the Clay Research Award in 2017 (with Scott Sheffield), and the Doeblin Prize in 2018. He was an invited speaker with talk Liouville quantum gravity as a metric space and a scaling limit at the International Congress of Mathematicians in 2018 in Rio de Janeiro. He was awarded the Leonard Eisenbud Prize for Mathematics and Physics of the AMS in 2023 jointly with Scott Sheffield.

Selected publications

References

External links
 Kevin Hartnett, A unified theory of randomness, Quanta Magazine, 2016

1983 births
Living people
20th-century American mathematicians
21st-century American mathematicians
University of Michigan alumni
Stanford University alumni
Academics of the University of Cambridge